Mittir Barir Chhoto Bou is a 1997 Bengali drama film directed by Sushil Mukhopadhyay. The film starring Abhishek Chatterjee, Indrani Dutta, Tapas Paul in lead roles. The film has been music composed by Anupam Dutta.

Cast
 Tapas Paul as Arindam Bose, Ritu's brother and a doctor
 Indrani Dutta as Anindita Mitra, Subhendu's wife
 Abhishek Chatterjee as Subhendu Mitra, youngest son of Mitra House
 Anil Chatterjee as Anil, Anindita's uncle
 Mita Chatterjee as Maternal Aunt of Anindita
 Supriya Choudhury as Subhendu's mother
 Debraj Roy as Bhushan Mitra, elder son of Mitra House and a businessman
 Nirmal Kumar as Maternal Uncle of Anindita
 Anuradha Ray as Ritu Mitra, eldest daughter-in-law of Mitra House
 Sanghamitra Bandyopadhyay as Kankona Mitra, second youngest daughter-in-law of Mitra House
 Kaushik Banerjee as Joydeb Mitra, second younger son of Mitra House and a lawyer

Soundtrack
Music of this film is composed by Anupam Dutta and the lyrics have penned by Pulak Bandopadhyay and Tapas Dutta, Kumar Sanu, Alka Yagnik, Sonu Nigam, Asha Bhosle had given their voices for the songs.

Track listings

 01. Swapno Amar Shoti Hoye Jaye by Sonu Nigam & Alka Yagnik
 02. Jokhoni Je Dike Jayee by Kumar Sanu & Alka Yagnik
 03. Mone Pore Ki Ki Tumi Chile by Kumar Sanu
 04. Mon Je Aamar Mayur Holo by Asha Bhosle
 05. Phire Elam Ami Sei Banglaye by Kumar Sanu

References

External links
 Mittir Barir Chhoto Bou on Gomolo

Bengali-language Indian films
1997 films
1990s Bengali-language films
Films scored by Anupam Dutta
Indian drama films